Iran competed at the 1964 Winter Olympics in Innsbruck, Austria. Four athletes and two officials represented Iran in the 1964 Olympics.

Competitors

Results by event

Skiing

Alpine

Men

References

External links
Official Olympic Reports

Nations at the 1964 Winter Olympics
1964
Winter Olympics
Pahlavi Iran